The Suzuki PV 50 is a motorcycle equipped with an air cooled  engine, drum brakes, kick start and four gears.
The thing about this moped is that it was only produced in Japan and the only country it was imported is Finland, which makes this moped very rare in any other country apart from Finland, Japan and Sweden (few has been sold to Sweden). 
The stock specs vary by the model of year, (1981-1993: 50cc cylinder with a Mikuni (company) VM12SH carburetor, 1993-2000: 50cc cylinder with a Mikuni (company) VM14SH.  This motorcycle (know in Finland as a Tossumopo) is known for its capabilities for tuning. You are able to put a 60cc, 70cc or a 74cc (80cc) Cylinder (engine) and a more powerful exhaust pipe. If you port the cylinder (cylinder port). You can easily pass the 100km/h (60mp/h) mark.

See also
Honda Z series

References

PV 50
Minibikes